Verbascum capitis-viridis is a species of flowers that belongs to the family Scrophulariaceae. The species is endemic to Cape Verde. The species was first named Celsia insularis by Murbeck, but Arthur Huber-Morath placed it in the Verbascum species in 1973. Its local name is sabão de feticeira.

Verbascum capitis-viridis is only found on the islands of Santo Antão, São Nicolau and Santiago. It is considered extinct on the islands of São Vicente, Boa Vista and Maio.

References

capitis-viridis
Flora of Santo Antão, Cape Verde
Flora of São Nicolau, Cape Verde
Flora of Santiago, Cape Verde
Endemic flora of Cape Verde